In geometry, the octagrammic antiprism is one in an infinite set of nonconvex antiprisms formed by triangle sides and two regular star polygon caps, in this case two octagrams.

See also
 Prismatic uniform polyhedron
Octagrammic crossed-antiprism

External links

Paper models of prisms and antiprisms

Prismatoid polyhedra